Natalia Grigoryevna Ushkina (born 7 September 1996 in Potma) is a Romanian biathlete hailing from Russia. She competed at the  2022 Winter Olympics, in Women's individual Biathlon, and Women's sprint.

She competed at the 2021–22 Biathlon World Cup.

References

External links 
 Natalia Ushkina from Romania during Biathlon at the Beijing 2022 Winter Olympic Games photo by Ulrik Pedersen/NurPhoto

1996 births
Living people
Romanian female biathletes
Russian female biathletes
Biathletes at the 2022 Winter Olympics
Olympic biathletes of Romania
Sportspeople from Mordovia
Russian emigrants to Romania